Gutland is a region covering the southern and central parts of the Grand Duchy of Luxembourg.  The Gutland (literally "Good Land") covers 68% of the territory of Luxembourg; to the north of Gutland lies the Oesling, which covers the remaining 32% of the Grand Duchy. To the east, the Luxembourgian Gutland adjoins the Bitburger Gutland of Germany.

Gutland is not an homogeneous region, and includes five main sub-regions: the Valley of the Seven Castles, Little Switzerland, the Luxembourg plateau, the Moselle valley, and the Red Lands.  Despite its variety, Gutland does have general geographic characteristics, both physical and human, that separate it from the Oesling.

Unlike the sparsely populated Oesling, Gutland is relatively urbanised.  Whereas the Oesling has only one town with a population larger than 2,000 people, Gutland has four cities with a population largely above 15,000 (Luxembourg City/Lëtzebuerg, Esch-sur-Alzette/Esch-Uelzecht, Differdange/Déifferdang and Dudelange/Diddeleng).  However, Gutland's urban areas are mostly congregated in the cantons of Esch-sur-Alzette (in luxembourgish: Esch op der Uelzecht), Luxembourg (Lëtzebuerg), Capellen (same in luxembourgish) and Mersch (Miersch), whereas some other parts of Gutland (cantons of Redange-sur-Attert/Réiden op der Atert, Echternach/Iechternach, Grewenmacher/Gréiwemaacher and Remich/Réimech) are almost as sparsely populated as the Oesling region.

The Gutland has a lower altitude above sea level and a flatter landscape than the Oesling.  Geologically, the Gutland is predominantly a large Jurassic-Triassic sandstone formation, part of the Lorrainian system; the Oesling is predominantly Devonian schist and quartz.  Both are wooded, but the Oesling's forests are more numerous and thicker, a testament to the slower pace of human development in the Oesling.  Most of the Gutland is fertile agricultural territory - hence the name.

Regions of Luxembourg
Natural regions of the Saar-Nahe Uplands
Regions of the Eifel